Lola Esbrat (born 29 August 1997) is a French pair skater. With her skating partner Andrei Novoselov, she has won three international medals and is the 2018 French national champion.

Personal life 
Esbrat was born on 29 August 1997 in Paris. She studied law via correspondence courses but had stopped her studies by January 2017.

Career 
Esbrat began learning to skate in 2004. She competed in ladies' singles through the 2013–14 season. She started training as a pair skater, in partnership with Nicolas Hejzlar, by July 2014.

Partnership with Novoselov 

Esbrat teamed up with Russia's Andrei Novoselov in mid-2015. They are coached by Claude Thevenard in Paris and compete for France. In 2016, the pair won bronze medals at the Toruń Cup and Bavarian Open. In early April, they competed at the 2016 World Championships in Boston; they qualified to the free skate and finished 16th overall.

In the 2016–17 season, Esbrat/Novoselov won the silver medal at the NRW Trophy and placed 5th at the Toruń  Cup. In January 2017, they placed 11th in the short program, 13th in the free skate, and 13th overall at the 2017 European Championships in Ostrava, Czech Republic.

Programs 
(with Novoselov)

Competitive highlights 
GP: Grand Prix; CS: Challenger Series

Pairs with Novoselov

Ladies' singles

References

External links 
 

1997 births
French female pair skaters
Living people
Figure skaters from Paris